Jiyyammavalasa is a village in Parvathipuram Manyam district of the Indian state of Andhra Pradesh.

It is located about 78 km from Vizianagaram city.

Demography
Jiyyammavalasa mandal had a population of 105,625 in 2008. Males constituted 27,887 and females 27,738 of the population. The average literacy rate was 51%. The male literacy rate was 64% and that of females 37%.
The big villages in this mandal are Jiyyammavalasa, Chinamerangi. The main corp is Paddy.

There are 58 revenue villages and 31 panchayats in Jiyyammavalasa mandal. This is one of the good places to live in any season.

References 

Villages in Parvathipuram Manyam district